The Dano-Swedish War from 1501 to 1512 was a military conflict between Denmark and Sweden within the Kalmar Union.

The war began with a Swedish and a Norwegian revolt against King Hans and the siege of Queen Christina in her castle in Danish-held Stockholm.

1501 to 1504 

On 1 January 1501, Swedish Regent Sten Sture the Elder and the Swedish National Council met in Vadstena Castle, at which the council approved the revolt against King Hans, and  declared the deposition of the king. Norwegian nobel Knut Alvsson was also there and directed harsh accusations against King Hans' control in Norway and was provided Swedish support for his return to Norway. 
Sten Sture besieged Tre Kronor Castle in Stockholm from September 1501 until 6 May 1502. The kings wife, Queen Christina was the commander of the castle. This was one of the hardest sieges known during the Kalmar Union, during which a garrison of 1000 men was reduced to 70 out of plague and starvation. In August 1501 a Swedish army took Örebro.

Knut Alvsson led at the same time Swedish forces in an attack on Båhus Fortress on the Swedish-Norwegian border. The fort was commanded by Henrich Krummedige. Krummedige was able to hold Båhus, but Alvsson captured Akershus Fortress and Tønsberg Fortress in March 1502.

King Hans dispatched his son Christian (later crowned King Christian II of Denmark and Norway) at the head of Danish forces; they relieved the siege of Båhus Fortress, and also captured Älvsborg Fortress across the river from Båhus Fortress. Krummedige then led forces north to finish off the rebellion by recapturing Tønsberg Fortress and investing Akershus Fortress, which Alvsson was defending.

When it became clear that the rebellion was stalemated, Alvsson came on board one of Krummedige's ships under a safe conduct. Krummedige's men killed Alvsson on 18 August 1502, either by treachery or, as alleged by Krummedige's men, in response to Alvsson's own violence. Breaking the rules of safe conduct was considered a grave treachery after the old Norse laws, which were still used in Norway at the time. However, the court in Oslo deemed Krummedige to have acted justly. The conditions for this judgement have been discussed by historians for years. Sten Sture invaded Norway in 1503, but failed to accomplish anything of importance. Nils Ravaldsson became the new leader of the rebellion, but it was crushed in December 1504, at Olsborg Castle.

1504 to 1509 
14 December 1503, Sten Sture died, and in 1504, Svante Nilsson became the new Regent of Sweden. The war continued, and the Danes and Swedes fought over the Danish-held city of Kalmar. It was also fighting in the border areas of Skåne, Halland and Blekinge. In July 1507, the Danish-Norwegian navy under the command of Søren Norby attacked Kastelholm Castle at Åland and burned it down. Later the same year, Dano-Norwegian military forces under the command of Henrich Krummedige attacked Nya Lödöse and burned the city down. In February 1508, Swedish military forces attacked the Danish town Væ and burned it down. In 1509, Sweden agreed to a declaration which recognised Hans as king of Sweden in principle, but he was never allowed into Stockholm as long as he lived, nor crowned king of Sweden anew, and the war renewed shortly after.

1509 to 1512 
Fighting intensified in 1509 and 1510 when the German city of Lübeck and the Hanseatic League helped Sweden to conquer Danish-held Kalmar and Borgholm. The recently established Danish-Norwegian Navy fought joint Hanseatic-Swedish naval forces at Nakskov and Bornholm in 1510 and 1511. In April 1512, a peace agreement was signed in Malmö.

Aftermath 
The war did not end the fighting between the kingdoms of the Kalmar Union, the result concerning Sweden was status quo, and a new war between the Kalmar Union and Sweden erupted in 1517, but Lübeck suffered a real political and economic setback by the peace. Norwegian attempts at opposition against Denmark  were strangled by King Hans's son Prince Christian (afterward King Christian II), who was the viceroy of Norway from 1506 until he became king of Denmark and Norway in 1513.

Literature 
George Childs Kohn (Hrsg.): Dictionary of Wars, page 142f. Routledge 2013
Hanno Brand (ed.): Trade, Diplomacy and Cultural Exchange – Continuity and Change in the North Sea Area and the Baltic 1350–1750, page 115ff. Uitgeverij Verloren, Hilversum 2005
Franklin Daniel Scott: Sweden, the Nation's History, page 99ff. SIU Press, 1988

References

1501 in Europe
1502 in Europe
1503 in Europe
1504 in Europe
1505 in Europe
1506 in Europe
1507 in Europe
1509 in Europe
1510 in Europe
1511 in Europe
1512 in Europe
Conflicts in 1501
Conflicts in 1502
Conflicts in 1503
Conflicts in 1504
Conflicts in 1505
Conflicts in 1506
Conflicts in 1507
Conflicts in 1508
Conflicts in 1509
Conflicts in 1510
Conflicts in 1511
Conflicts in 1512
Wars involving Denmark
Wars involving Sweden
Wars involving Norway
Denmark–Sweden relations
Kalmar Union
16th-century conflicts
16th-century rebellions
History of Lübeck
Wars involving the Hanseatic League
16th century in Sweden
16th century in Denmark
16th century in Norway
1501 in Sweden
1512 in Sweden
1501 in Denmark
1512 in Denmark
1501 in Norway
1504 in Norway